Samantha Jade is the self-titled debut studio album by Samantha Jade, the 2012 winner of The X Factor Australia, released through Sony Music Australia on 7 December 2012. The album's lead single "What You've Done to Me" preceded the album's release.

Background 
In 2006 Jade recorded the title track "Step Up" for the 2006 Universal Pictures dance drama film Step Up, which was produced by rapper and music producer Wyclef Jean. The single, which had little promotion, appeared for one week on the Billboard Pop 100 peaking at number 92. In 2007 Jade released her follow-up single "Turn Around" which underperformed. Jade began recording her debut album My Name is Samantha Jade with producers Darkchild, Timbaland, Max Martin and Stargate. "Apple" the album suffered numerous set-backs and was not released. In 2007 Jade co-wrote and sang back-up vocals on the track "Positivity" on Ashley Tisdale's debut album Headstrong.

Jade was later dropped from Jive Records and attempted to continue to work on music independently with American record label Affinity West Entertainment. That same year Jade made her acting debut in the film Beneath the Blue, a sequel to Eye of the Dolphin. The film was released in 2009. Jade recorded a track the following year with David Guetta and Laidback Luke for David Guetta's fourth studio album One Love which was released in August. The track did not make the final track-listing but is featured as a bonus track on certain international releases. In July 2009 Jade released her third single "Secret" in Australia, which failed to chart. The official music video for the single was directed by Valerie Babayan. In August 2009 Jade performed on Kerri-Anne to promote the single. In November 2011, Jade relocated to Perth and began working at her father's mining factory counting stock.

Samantha Jade features re-recorded studio tracks of some of Jade's performances during the live shows on The X Factor Australia, as well as her winner's single, "What You've Done to Me".

Release 
Samantha Jade was released by Sony Music Australia on 7 December 2012, as both digital download and CD formats. And the Indonesian edition was released with 2 bonus tracks in CD format.

Singles 
Following Jade's win on the fourth season of The X Factor Australia on 20 November 2012, her winner's single "What You've Done to Me" was released for digital download, and served as the lead single from the album.

Track listing

Charts

Weekly chart

Year-end chart

Certifications

Release history

References

2012 debut albums
Samantha Jade albums
Sony Music Australia albums
Albums produced by DNA Songs
Covers albums